"L'univers a besoin d'amour" (meaning "The Universe Needs Love") is a single by Celine Dion, released in 1986 in Quebec, Canada. "L'univers a besoin d'amour" is a non-album track. The B-side includes totally different version of that song, which is a duet with Paul Baillargeon, who wrote and produced the song.

Track listings and formats
Canadian 7" single
"L'univers a besoin d'amour" – 3:44
"L'univers a besoin d'amour" (duet with Paul Baillargeon) – 3:16

References

1986 singles
1986 songs
Celine Dion songs
French-language songs
Songs written by Paul Baillargeon